Jean de Bueil may refer to:

Jean IV de Bueil (died 1415), lord of Bueil-en-Touraine
Jean V de Bueil (1406–1477), count of Sancerre, captain general, and admiral of France